Apiomerus cazieri is a species of assassin bug found in the Chihuahuan and Sonoran Deserts of the southwestern United States and northern Mexico. It is a known predator of Trichodes ornatus, as well as honey bees.

References

cazieri
Insects described in 2011
Insects of Mexico
Fauna of the Sonoran Desert
Fauna of the Chihuahuan Desert